José Anibal Lopes Rocha was the Angolan minister for territorial administration in the 1994 government of Jose Eduardo dos Santos.

References 

Living people
Angolan politicians
Governors of Cabinda
Governors of Luanda
Governors of Uíge
Governors of Zaire
Territory Administration ministers of Angola
1948 births